FilmRise is a New York City–based film and television studio and streaming network, which has become one of the largest independent providers of content to ad-supported streaming (AVOD) platforms, in addition to providing the largest free direct to consumer service with its 22-owned and operated streaming channels, the "FilmRise Streaming Network". Currently, the FilmRise Streaming Network has reported more than 31.5 million downloads in the U.S. and can be seen on Roku, Amazon Fire TV, Comcast, iOS, Android and Apple, among other platforms. FilmRise also syndicates its own digital linear channels (aka "Free ad-supported streaming television") to platforms including The Roku Channel, Samsung TV Plus, Amazon's Freevee and Vizio.

FilmRise has created a proprietary data analytics algorithm methodology that predicts consumer demand of content irrespective of perceived industry demand. This content is either under the radar or significantly underestimated by the industry.

The company was founded in 2012 by producer/financiers Danny Fisher, Jack Fisher, and Alan Klingenstein.

FilmRise has experienced rapid growth in revenue and profitability over the past several years, as its predictive analytics of content usage has resulted in high traffic of its content library of over 40,000 movies and TV episodes on third party platforms including The Roku Channel, Pluto TV, Tubi, Peacock, Samsung TV Plus, Crackle, Redbox and Amazon's Freevee, as well as the growth of its own direct to consumer service, the FilmRise Streaming Network. More recently, the COVID-19 pandemic has caused streaming to surge as audiences are viewing their entertainment primarily from home.

In addition to digital syndication to streaming services, FilmRise licenses content to cable and broadcast partners such as HBO, Starz, PBS and Paramount Global.

History

In 2012, Danny and Jack Fisher began studying the current state of television and film and developed a new concept for the emerging digital industry. Their vision took shape as a marriage between data, content, audiences, and the internet. Proprietary data analytics were used to measure demand for content and they envisioned digital channels where viewers would get their content for free. This became the foundation of FilmRise's business model for OTT including SVOD/AVOD.

Also in 2012, Alan Klingenstein joined onto the project as a partner, and the three became the Founders of Fisher Klingenstein Ventures, LLC, soon to be known as FilmRise (FilmRise is a d/b/a of Fisher Klingenstein Ventures, LLC).

They began to use the model to acquire dormant and/or under-recognized film and television content and distribute the titles on DVD and digital platforms, such as Amazon's Disc on Demand and YouTube. The analytics model proved highly successful and the company quickly became profitable. Danny, Jack and Alan remain the largest stakeholders in FilmRise. Alan currently serves as chairman of the board, Danny is CEO, and Jack is president.

In 2013, Medstar Productions put the digital rights of the long running syndicated hit and staple of the HLN network, Forensic Files, up for license. FilmRise licensed the exclusive U.S. digital distribution rights and has released the property successfully on numerous platforms, including Netflix and Hulu, making the show one of the most popular library shows in the streaming space.

Using its algorithms to predict consumer behavior the company continued to acquire the digital rights to television and film content, including Unsolved Mysteries, Hell's Kitchen, 3rd Rock from the Sun and Midsomer Murders,  creating a distribution operation that enabled the company to monetize content and build out a sales/operations team to foster relationships with new and emerging digital platforms, including The Roku Channel, Fox Corporation's Tubi, Amazon's IMDb TV, NBCUniversal's Peacock, ViacomCBS' Pluto TV, among many others.

In 2014, FilmRise created a free direct-to-consumer brand, supported by advertising on proprietary apps, The FilmRise Streaming Network, which launched on Roku. Over the past five years, the channel was added to internet-connected devices including Amazon Fire TV, Comcast, iOS, Android and Apple TV. The FilmRise Streaming Network is regularly featured in lists of the top ten free streaming destinations.

In 2017, FilmRise became one of the first content providers on The Roku Channel and has since become a leading content provider on numerous ad-supported streaming services including NBCUniversal's Peacock, Amazon's Freevee, ViacomCBS' Pluto TV, Fox Corporation's Tubi, Redbox, Vudu, Crackle, STIRR and others.

By the end of 2017, the company raised over $100MM for content acquisitions. These money were used to pay license fees for film and television libraries. FilmRise continued to work with emerging digital platforms, as well as growing relationships with major Hollywood studios and television networks that were eager for new licensing opportunities. FilmRise's ability to optimize monetization from TV and film content enabled them to work with many streaming platforms on their programming strategies.

At this point, FilmRise began to accumulate actionable data from the distribution of over 10,000 hours of content across a wide range of platforms, enabling the company to refine and improve on its proprietary data analytics.

In 2020, the company debuted their first original co-production, Bloodline Detectives with Nancy Grace, which is airing on broadcast television via syndication, and will soon be streamed on digital platforms. FilmRise currently has five programs in development and/or production.

In 2020, FilmRise implemented machine learning and automation for its data analytics algorithms, creating more accuracy and efficiency in its predictive capabilities. Currently the company is predominantly a digital streaming content syndicator whose content providers include Warner Bros., MGM, Disney, Nelvana, Scholastic Entertainment, Carsey-Werner Productions, Discovery, BBC, ITV Studios, Stephen Cannell Entertainment, Banijay, All3Media, among many others, and has accumulated a library of over 40,000 films and TV episodes.

In 2021, FilmRise had entered in an exclusive deal with Fuji TV's distribution arm, Fuji Creative Corporation.

FilmRise has also become a pioneer in the international ad-supported streaming space. Among the overseas platforms that the company currently provides content to are: Rakuten, Pluto TV and The Roku Channel.

In May 2022 it was announced that FilmRise had acquired streaming rights for Nomad of Nowhere, Camp Camp, and Red vs. Blue, three Rooster Teeth productions, grouping episodes from each series into "traditional half-hour formats and seasons for streaming."

In November 2022, it was announced that FilmRise had acquired streaming rights for Hemlock Grove and Hannibal.

Film

 A Guide to Recognizing Your Saints
 A Little Bit of Heaven
 Abner, The Invisible Dog
 Babar: King of the Elephants
 Babar: The Movie
 Bad Lieutenant: Port of Call New Orleans
 Bernie
 Can't Be Heaven
 Dog Gone
 Donnie Darko
 Driveways
 Going Clear: Scientology and the Prison of Belief
 Jack and the Beanstalk
 Khumba
 Little Nemo: Adventures in Slumberland
 Manifesto
 Marjorie Prime
 Memento
 Mickey Matson and the Copperhead Conspiracy
 Miracle Dogs Too
 Miracle Dogs
 Monster
 My Brother the Pig
 My Friend Dahmer
 Pirates of the Plain
 Resurrecting the Champ
 Rob the Mob
 Sabrina the Teenage Witch
 Scorched
 Seventeen Again
 Sign o' the Times
 Sprinter
 Stellaluna
 The Adventure Club
 The Ghost Club
 The Illusionist
 The Miseducation of Cameron Post
 The Ponysitters Club: Fun at the fair
 The Ponysitters Club: The big Sleepover
 The Time Capsule
 The Vault
 Welcome to Me

Television 
Forensic Files
Hell's Kitchen
3rd Rock from the Sun
Unsolved Mysteries – the original Robert Stack episodes  
21 Jump Street
Midsomer Murders
The Rifleman
The Greatest American Hero
Roseanne
Kitchen Nightmares
Shameless
The Commish
Highway to Heaven
Grounded for Life
Father Ted
Grace Under Fire
Cybill
Case Histories
Neverland
Dinotopia
Wycliffe
Iron Chef
Hunter
Heartland
The Kids in the Hall
Hemlock Grove
Hannibal

Children's programming 
 Inspector Gadget
 My Pet Monster
 COPS
 Babar
 The Super Mario Bros. Super Show!
 The Baby-Sitters Club
 Rupert
 The Big Comfy Couch
 Barney & Friends
 Cadillacs and Dinosaurs 
 Adventures of Sonic the Hedgehog
 Madeline
 Tales from the Cryptkeeper
 Where on Earth Is Carmen Sandiego?
 Wild C.A.T.s
 Gadget Boy & Heather
 Nancy Drew
 The Hardy Boys
 Stickin' Around 
 Donkey Kong Country
 Mummies Alive!
 Ned's Newt
 Pippi Longstocking
 Bear in the Big Blue House
 Franklin Animorphs Rolie Polie Olie Rescue Heroes Sabrina: The Animated Series Maggie and the Ferocious Beast Marvin the Tap-Dancing Horse Timothy Goes to School Braceface Degrassi: The Next Generation Horrible Histories Liberty's Kids Beyblade: Metal Fusion Beyblade: Metal Fusion Beyblade: Metal Masters Beyblade: Metal Fury Beyblade: Shogun Steel Angelina Ballerina I Spy My Dad the Rock Star Jacob Two-Two Strawberry Shortcake Maya & Miguel 6teen Being Ian Horseland Grossology Jane and the Dragon Ruby Gloom DinoSquad Bakugan Battle Brawlers Bakugan Battle Brawlers Bakugan: New Vestoria Bakugan: Gundalian Invaders Bakugan: Mechtanium Surge My Friend Rabbit Kid vs. Kat Pearlie Sidekick Scaredy Squirrel Mike the Knight Slugterra Camp Lakebottom Oh No! It's an Alien Invasion Astroblast Little Charmers''

References

External links
 
 

Film distributors of the United States
Television syndication distributors
Internet broadcasting
Entertainment companies based in New York City
Privately held companies based in New York City
American companies established in 2012
Entertainment companies established in 2012
Mass media companies established in 2012
2012 establishments in New York City